Crack Cloud are a Canadian musical and multimedia collective based in Vancouver, British Columbia, formed by drummer and frontman, Zach Choy. Alongside the group's core musical members who perform live as a band, a large number of multimedia artists are also associated and operate simultaneously as an in-house production studio within the group, due to the project's strong focus on visual storytelling.

To date, they have released two studio albums, Pain Olympics (2020) and their most recent, Tough Baby (2022).

History

Formed in 2015, Crack Cloud started as the solo project of lead vocalist and drummer, Zach Choy while living in Calgary, Alberta. Soon after, the project moved to Vancouver in 2018, where most of its members met through various addiction recovery and mental health programmes both as participants and as support workers. Choy stated that the purpose of Crack Cloud is a "healing mechanism"  The group's logo is also notable as an appropriation of the exclamation mark used by Concerned Children's Advertisers, a series of public service announcements aimed towards children on various topics (drug abuse, peer pressure, exercise, etc.) that were broadcast on Canadian television during 1990's until the mid-2000's.

Crack Cloud released their first self-titled EP, in 2016, followed by another the next year called Anchoring Point in 2017. These two EP's were re-released as a self-titled compilation via Deranged and Tin Angel/Meat Machine Records on June 1, 2018. Following those releases, the group toured internationally and featured at several music festivals including Levitation, End of the Road, and Roskilde which garnered the group considerable exposure between North America, The United Kingdom and Europe respectively.

Crack Cloud released their debut studio album, Pain Olympics via Meat Machine Records on July 17, 2020, preceded by four singles, The Next Fix, Ouster Stew, Tunnel Vision and Favour Your Fortune between May 2019 until October 2020. The record was received favourably, based on the album receiving an average score of 87 from 8 reviews on Metacritic, indicating "universal acclaim".

On July 8, 2021, the group were named as the winners of the Hi-Fidelity Award, a prize for Canadian recording artists use of innovation within their music videos at the 2021 Prism Prize.

On May 11, 2022, Crack Cloud announced their second album, Tough Baby released September 16, 2022 via Meat Machine, with the release of the album's first single, Please Yourself. The album's self-titled second single was released on July 8, 2022. 
Costly Engineered Illusion, the album's third single was released September 1. 2022.

Members
Current
 Zach Choy – lead vocals, drums, synthesizer, film editor, producer, songwriter, percussion (2015–present)
 Mohammad "Mo" Ali Sharar – rhythm guitar, bass, keyboards, sampler, backing vocals, production, graphic design, film editor  (2016–present)
 Will Choy –  lead guitar, backing vocals (2018–present)
 Garnet Aroynk – rhythm guitar, bass, backing vocals (2019–present)
 Bryce Cloghesy – saxophone, lead guitar, sampler (2017–present)
 Jesse Atkey – saxophone, sampler, backing vocals (2018–present)
 Aleem Khan – keyboards, synthesizers, backing vocals (2021–present)

Former
 Jon Varley –  lead guitar, backing vocals (2016–2020)
 Noah Varley – bass (2016–2020)
 Daniel Robertson – keyboards, synthesizers, rhythm guitar, backing vocals (2018–2022)

Associates
 Eve Adams  – singer, vocals
 Mackenzie Cruse – singer, vocals, graphic design
 Nicolas Dirksen – engineering, mixing, strings, additional percussion, additional synths
 Missy Donaldson – singer, vocals
 Wei Huang – graphic design, lettering
 Jennilee Marigomen – photography
 David Novotny  – guitar, lap steel, flute
 Eris Nyx  – artist, activist, community organizer 
 Eden Solomon – dancer, choreography
 John Paul Stewart – engineering, mixing, processing
 Jing Wang – photography, graphic design, assistant choreography

Discography

 Studio Albums
 Pain Olympics (2020) 
 Tough Baby (2022) 

 EPs
 Crack Cloud (2016)
 Anchoring Point (2017) 

 Compilations
 Crack Cloud (2018) 
 Live Leak (2020)

Music videos

As "Crack Cloud"

As "Crack Cloud Media Studio"

Recognition

Prism Prize
The Prism Prize is a national, juried award established to recognize outstanding artistry in the Canadian music video production community. The Hi-Fidelity Award is presented to a recording artist(s) who has used video art to represent their work in a consistently creative and innovative way.

|-
| 2021
| Crack Cloud
| Hi-Fidelity Award
| 
|}

References

Canadian punk rock groups
Musical groups from Calgary